An A-Z list of television series produced in Sweden and the date of first airing:


-
100 höjdare (2004) 
13 Demon Street (1959) 
16 år (1960) 
1628 (1991) 
2 mot 1 (1998) 
24 karat (1990) 
24 Konsument
3 Friends and Jerry (1999)
7-9 (1992)Den 5:e kvinnan (2002) (mini) Äkta Människor (2012)Ett Äktenskap i kris (1992) (mini) Älskade Lotten (1996) En ängels tålamod (2001) Åshöjdens BK (1985) (mini) Änglarna sover (1997) (mini) Äntligen hemma (1997) Äntligen Hi-Tech (2006) Ärliga blå ögon (1977) (mini) En ö i havet (2003) Öbergs på Lillöga (1983) Ögonblickets barn (1991) Öppna dagar (2003)

AAdam (1993) Affären Ramel (1985) Agnes (2001) Albert & Herbert (1974) Alberts och Herberts jul (1982) Alla vi barn i Bullerbyn (1987) Allis med is (1993) (mini) Allra mest tecknat (2002) Allsång på Skansen (1979) Allt ljus på mig! (1987) Amforans gåta (1989) Anderssons älskarinna (2001) (mini) Andra Avenyn (2007-) Anmäld försvunnen (1995) Anna Holt - polis (1996) Anna och gänget (1978) (mini) Antikrundan (1989) Arns rike (2004) (mini) Aspiranterna (1998) August Palms äventyr (1985) (mini) August Strindberg: Ett liv (1985) Avatopia (2003)

BBabels hus (1981) Bamse - världens starkaste björn! (1972) Bara med Britt (1992) Bara med Bruno (1997) Baren (2000) Barnen i höjden (1972) (mini) Barnen på Luna (2000) Beck (1997) Belinder auktioner (2003) Bella bland kryddor och kriminella (2002) Beppes godnattstund (1970) Berglunds begravningar (2003) Bert (1994)Big Brother Sweden (2000-2004)Big Brother Norge vs. Sverige (2005-2006)Bingolotto (1989) Björnes magasin (1987) Blueprint (1992) (mini) Blå gatan (1966) (mini) Bombi Bitt och jag (1968) Bondånger (1997) (mini) Boston Tea Party (2007) Bota mig! (2006) (mini) Brandvägg (2006) (mini) Britt Yngves (1999) (mini) Broster, Broster! (1971) (mini) Brottsvåg (2000) Browalls (1999) Bröderna Fluff (1996) Bröderna Lejonhjärta (1985) Bröderna Malm (1972) Bröderna Olsson (1987) Bröderna (1974) (mini) Bullen (1987) Byhåla (1991)Byhåla 2 - Tillbaka till Fårrden (1992) Byhåla 3 (1993) 

Cc/o Segemyhr (1998) Carl-Jans änglar (2006) Casino Comedy Club (1990) Celeb Poker (2005) Cleo (2002) Club Goa (2005) Cluedo - en mordgåta (1996) Coachen (2005) Cosmomind (2003) Creepschool (2003)

DDagar med Knubbe (1976) Daghemmet Lyckan (1987) (mini) Danslärarens återkomst (2004) (mini) Decemberdröm, En (2005) Destination Nordsjön (1990) Det blir jul på Möllegården (1980) Det blåser på månen (1985) (mini) Det brinner! (2002) (mini) Det finns inga smålänningar (1981) (mini) Det spökar (1999) Det var då... (1989) (mini) Detta har hänt (1996) Dieselråttor och sjömansmöss (2002) Din stund på jorden (1973) (mini) Djursjukhuset (1997) Dokument: Humor (2005) Dolly & Dolly (1998) (mini) Dom kallar oss Tratten & Finkel (1996) Doobidoo (2005) Dr. Mugg (2002) De Drabbade (2003) Drottningens juvelsmycke (1967) (mini) Drømmekvinden (2004) Du bestämmer (1994) Dubbelstötarna (1980) (mini) Dubbelsvindlarna (1982) (mini) Dåres försvarstal, En (1976) (mini) Dårfinkar & dönickar (1989) Döda danskar räknas inte (1994) (mini)

EEbba och Didrik (1990) Efterlyst (1991) Elake polisen, Den (1989) (mini) Emblas hemlighet (2006) Emil i Lönneberga (1974) Emma åklagare (1997) Engeln II (1976) (mini) Engeln (1974) (mini) Errol (2003) (mini) Esters testamente (1994) (mini) Estonia - Livlinan som brast (2002) (mini) Estrad (1967) Eva & Adam (1999)

FFallet Paragon (1994) (mini) Fame Factory (2002) (mini) Familjen Ekbladh (1971) (mini) Familjen Schedblad (1988) Familjen (2002) Farbror Frippes skafferi (1976) Farbror Pekkas handelsbod (1965) Farbrorn som inte vill va' stor (1979) Farlig kurs (1965) (mini) Farmen (2001/II) Farmor och vår herre (1983) (mini) Fem dagar i december (1981) Fem gånger Storm (2000) Fem myror är fler än fyra elefanter (1973) (mini) Fiendens fiende (1990) (mini) Firklang (1965) Fiskeläget (1974) (mini) Flickan vid stenbänken (1989) Fling (2004) Flykten (1986) (mini) Fot i graven, En (2001) (mini) Fredrikssons fabrikk (1990) Frida och hennes vän (1970) (mini) Frihetens skugga (1994) (mini) Friställd (1969) (mini) Fråga om liv och död, En (2006) (mini) Från A till Ö (1974) Från Bosnien (1996) (mini) Från och med herr Gunnar Papphammar (1980) Full frys (1999) Full fräs med Stefan & Krister (1993) Fyra för tre, En (1996) Fådda blommor (1988) (mini) Fångarna på fortet (1991) FörKväll (2006) Förmannen som försvann (1997) Förnimmelse av mord (2002) Första kärleken (1992) (mini) Förste zigenaren i rymden, Den (2002) (mini)

GGay Army (2006) Geheimnis des Steins, Das (1992)  (1983) (mini) GladPack (2000) (mini) Glappet (1997) (mini) Glöm inte mamma! (1998) God morgon alla barn (2005) (mini) Goda grannar (1987) Goda viljan, Den (1991) (mini) Godafton Sverige (2003) Godnatt, jord (1979) Godnatt, Sverige (2005) Gold Rush, The (2000) (mini) Gott parti, Ett (2007) Grattis Världen! (2005) Graven (2004) (mini) Greta och Albert (1958) Gråtande ministern, Den (1993) (mini) Gubben Pettson (1993) (mini) Guld (1988) (mini) Guldburen (1991) (mini) Gumman som blev liten som en tesked (1967) (mini) Gyldne pil, Den (1973) Gynekologen i Askim (2007) (mini) Gäst hos Hagge (1975) Gösta Berlings saga (1986) (mini)

HHalsduken (1962) (mini) Hammarkullen (1997) (mini) Handbok för handlösa (1994) Hedebyborna (1978) (mini) Heja Björn (2002) Helt apropå (1985) Hem till byn (1971) Hem till midgård (2003) Hemliga verkligheten, Den (1972) Hemligas Ö, De (1973) Hemma hos Olssons (1997) Hemma hoz (1985) (mini) Herkules Jonssons storverk (1969) (mini) Hermans historia (1991) Herr von Hancken (2000) (mini) Herrans liv, Ett (2006) Hey Baberiba (2005) High Chaparall (2003) Himla många program, En (1989) (mini) Himmel och pannkaka (1977) Hipp hipp - Itzhaks julevangelium (2006) (mini) HippHipp! (2001) Historier kring slott och herresäten (2000) (mini) Historiske arbejdspladser (2003) Hjälp! Rånare! (2002) (mini) Hjälp! (2007) Hjärnkontoret (1995) Hjärtats saga (1998) Hombres (2006) Hon och Hannes (2005) Hos Jidhe (2006) Hotel Seger (2000) Humorlabbet (2001) Hundra svenska år (1999) Hur ska det gå för Pettersson? (1984) (mini) Huset Silfvercronas gåta (1974) Hylands hörna (1962) Håkan Bråkan (2003) Håll huvet kallt (1994) Håll polisen utanför (1969) (mini) Häktet (2005) (mini) Höjdarna (2004) Höök (2007)

II afton Lantz (2001) I havsbandet (1971) (mini) I manegen med Glenn Killing (1992) (mini) I mumindalen (1973) (mini) I regnbågslandet (1970) (mini) Ika i rutan (1988) Ikas TV-kalas (1990) Ingesson (1995) Insider (1999) (mini) Irma och Gerd (1997) 
 Italienska halmhatten, Den (1974) (mini)

JJakten på en mördare (1999) (mini) Jakten på ökenguldet (1999) Jane Horney (1985) (mini) Jeopardy! (1991) Jobbet och jag (1998) Jonson & Pipen (2006) Jonssons onsdag (1983) (mini) Jordskott (2015) Jul i Kapernaum (1995) Julbåten Juliana (1961) Julens hjältar (1999) Julius Julskötare (1978) (mini) Julstrul med Staffan och Bengt (1984) Jävla Kajsa (1999)

KKafé Luleå (1994) Kajsas ko (1999) Kakan (1991) Kalender für alle (1996) Kalles klätterträd (1975) Kallocain (1981) (mini) Kaspar i Nudådalen (2001) Katitzi (1979) Kenny Starfighter (1997) Klart spår till Tomteboda (1968) (mini) Klass för sig, En (2000) Klasses julkalender (1992) Klasskrig (1998) (mini) Kniven i hjärtat (2004) (mini) Koiramäki (2004) (mini) Komikers uppväxt, En (1992) (mini) Kommissarie Winter (2001) Kommissionen (2005) (mini) Kobra (2001)Kontrapunkt (1971) Korsikanske biskopen, Den (1993) (mini) Kronprinsessan (2006) (mini) Kråkguldet (1969) Kråsnålen (1988) Krøniken (2004) Kulla-Gulla (1986) (mini) Kullagret (1986) Kullamannen (1967) Kungamordet (2008) (mini) Kurt Olssons julkalender (1990) Kurt Olssons television (1987) Kusiner i kubik (1992) Kvalster (2005) (mini) Kvarteret Skatan (2003) Kvartetten som sprängdes (1973) (mini) Kvinnan i det låsta rummet (1998) (mini) Kvinnor emellan (2004) Kvällspressen (1992) Kära farmor (1990) (mini) Köpmanshus i skärgården, Ett (1972) (mini)

LLabyrint (2007) Labyrinten (2000) (mini) Lagt kort ligger (1987)Lasermannen (2005) (mini) LasseMajas detektivbyrå (2006) Leende guldbruna ögon (2007) (mini) Lena Maria Show (1980) Levande föda (2007) (mini) Lill-Stina på reportage i Storskogen (1964) Lilla Aktuellt (1992) Lille Luj och Änglaljus i strumpornas hus (1983) Linné och hans apostlar (2004) Lisa (1998) Lita på det oväntade (1988) (mini) Lite som du (2005) Liten film, En (1999) (mini) Litet rött paket, Ett (1999) Liv i luckan med julkalendern (1988) Livet enligt Rosa (2005) Livräddarna (2005) Livshunger (2002) Lokalreportern (2004) (mini) Lorry (1989) Lotta på Bråkmakargatan (1992) Lotta (1995) Lukas 8:18 (1999) Lycka till (1980) Lyckligt lottade, De (1976) Långtradarchaufförens berättelse (1975) (mini) Låt stå! (2000) Längtans blåa blomma (1998) (mini) Lära för livet (1975) (mini) Lösa förbindelser (1985) 

MMacken (1986) Macklean (1993) (mini) Madicken (1979) Magnus och Brasse show (1980) Mahabharata, The (1989) (mini) Maj Fant (1993) Majken (1995) (mini) Makt på spel (1973) Malmvägen (2006) Marerittet (1990) (mini) Marias barn (1987) Medicinmannen (2005) (mini) Melodifestivalen (1959)Millionæren (2004) Mimmi (1988) Min f.d. familj (2004) Min vän Percys magiska gymnastikskor (1994) Min vän shejken i Stureby (1997) (mini) Mirakelpojken (2001) Mitt i livet (1999) Mitt sanna jag (1995) Mor gifter sig (1979) (mini) Mord och passion (1991) Morsarvet (1993) (mini) Mullvaden (2000) Mumintrollet (1969) Musikbyrån (1996) Mysteriet på Greveholm (1996) Måndagsklubben (1996) Mäklarna (2006) Män emellan (2003) (mini) Mäster Olof (1983) (mini) Mästerverket (2006) (mini) Möbelhandlarens dotter (2006) (mini) Mördare utan ansikte (1994) (mini)

NN.P. Möller, fastighetsskötare (1972) Nattsudd (1985) Niklas önskedjur (1972) NileCity 105,6 (1995) (mini) Nils-Petter Sundgrens Från Pussar till Porr (1994) Nina, Nora, Nalle (1961) (mini) Nisse Hults historiska snedsteg (2006) Nr. 13 (1998) NU er det NU (2000) Nu seglar Pip-Larssons (1971) Nudlar och 08:or (1996) Nya tider (1999) Nybyggarland (1972) Nyhetsmorgon (1992) Någonstans i Sverige (1973) (mini) Nämndemans död, En (1995) (mini) När karusellerna sover (1998) Närbild (2004) Nästa man till rakning (1993) (mini) Nöjesmaskinen (1982) Nöjesmassakern (1985) Nöjesredaktionen - i allmänhetens tjänst (1998)

OOcean Ave. (2002) Offer och gärningsmän (1999) (mini) Offside (1971) (mini) Okända, Det (2004) Oldsbergs Europa (1998) Olivia Twist (2002) (mini) Om du var jag (2005) (mini) Om Stig Petrés hemlighet (2004) (mini) Onkel Thores Stuga (1967) OP7 (1997) Operation Argus (1966) (mini) Operation Stella Polaris (2003) (mini) Orient-Express (1979) (mini) Orka! Orka! (2004) Osynlig närvaro (1991) (mini)

PPank (1981) Pappa polis (2002) (mini) Pappa vet bäst (1978) Pappas flicka (1997) Pappas pojkar (1973) Papphammar (1999) Paradise Hotel (2005/I) Paragraf 9 (2003) Parlamentet (1999) Pelle Jansson (1973) (mini) Pelle Svanslös (1997) Pentagon (1997) Percy Tårar (1996) Persons parfymeri (1997) Peta näsan (1987) Petter kommer igen (1963) (mini) Pip-Larssons (1998) Pippi Långstrump (1969) Pistvakt – En vintersaga (1998) Plastic Fantastic (2003) Playa del Sol (2007) Pojken med guldbyxorna (1975) (mini) Pojken som lånade ut sin röst (1979) (mini) Polisen och domarmordet (1993) (mini) Polisen och pyromanen (1996) (mini) Polisen som vägrade ge upp (1984) (mini) Polisen som vägrade svara (1982) (mini) Poliser (2006) Popside (1966) Popverkstan (2005) (mini) Portis klarar skivan (1991) Prat i kvadrat (1985) Profitörerna (1983) (mini) Prästkappan (1986) (mini) PTV - Penetrerings-TV (1991) Pusselbitar (2001) (mini) På gränsen (2000) På kurs med Kurt (1981) (mini) På spåret (1987)

RRadioskugga (1995) Raggadish (2004) Rallarsving (2005) Ramona (2003) (mini) Rapport till himlen (1994) (mini) Raskens (1976) (mini)Rasmus på luffen (1981) Real World Stockholm, The (1995) Real World Visby, The (1996) Rederiet (1992) Rejseholdet (2000) Rena rama Rolf (1994) Rena rama sanningen (1993) Resande teatersällskap, Ett (1977) (mini) Reuter & Skoog (1999) Rid i natt! (1985) (mini) Riget II (1997) (mini) Riget (1994) (mini) Riksorganet (1998)Riktig Jul, En (2007) Ringlek (1982) (mini) Risto Räppääjä (2000) (mini) Robin (1993) Robins (2006) Robinson VIP (2005) Rocky + Drago (2006) Roligt elakt aktuellt (2001) Ronny & Julia (2000) Rosenbaddarna (1990) Rosenbaum (1991) (mini) Rosenholm (1991) Rulle på Rulseröd (1974) (mini) Rummel & Rabalder (1997) Röd snö (1985) (mini) Röda rummet (1970) (mini)

SS*M*A*S*H (1990) (mini) S:t Mikael (1998) Sally (1999) Saltön 2 (2007) (mini) Saltön (2005) Sam and the River (1975) Sammansvärjningen (1986) (mini) Sanningen om Marika (2007) Sant och sånt (1972) Schaurige Geschichten (1975) Selambs (1979) (mini) Semlons gröna dalar (1977) (mini) Sen kväll med Luuk (1996) Septet (1966) Sexton (1996) (mini) Silvermannen (1996) (mini) Sinkadus (1980) (mini) Sjukan (1995) Sjätte dagen (1999) Skatten på Bråtehus (1984) (mini) Skeppsholmen (2002) Skeppsredaren (1979) Skilda världar (1996) Skrivklådan (1986) Skrotnisse och hans vänner (1985) (mini) Skuggornas hus (1996) (mini) Skulden (1982) (mini) Skyll inte på mig (1978) Skärgårdsdoktorn (1997) Skärgårdsflirt (1972) (mini) Skärp dig, älskling (1981) (mini) Slättemölla by (1968) (mini) Småpratarna (1996) Småstad vid seklets början, En (1966) Snacka om nyheter (1995) Snapphanar (2006) (mini) Snoken (1993) Snutarna - SWIP (1994) Societetshuset (1963) (mini) Solbacken:Avd. E (2003) (mini) Soldater i månsken (2000) (mini) Solisterna (2003) (mini) Solo (1994) Solstollarna (1985) Som löven i Vallombrosa (1995) (mini) Sommarflickan (1976) Sommarkrysset (2005) Spacer (2002) Spung (2002) Stackars Tom (2002) (mini) Stereo se/dk (2003) Stereo (1996) Stjärnhuset (1981) Stjärnorna på slottet (2006) (mini) Stjärnsmällar och julpussar (1986) Stockholm Live (2004) Stockholmare (2001) Stora skälvan (1972) Stora teatern (2002) (mini) Storstad (1990) Straffet (1974) (mini) Studierektorns sista strid (1986) (mini) Studio S (1976) Studio Virtanen 2006 (2006) Styv kuling (1980) (mini) Sug (2003) Sunes jul (1991) Supersnällasilversara och Stålhenrik (2005) (mini) Svara på skoj (1992) Svarta cirkeln, Den (1990) Svarta skallar och vita nätter (1995) (mini) Svenska hjärtan (1987) Svenska mord (2000) Svenska slut (2002) Svensson Svensson (1994) Sverige - Tusen år (1999) Sverige dansar och ler (2007) Så går det till på Saltkråkan (1977) Så ska det låta (1997) Söderkåkar (1970) (mini) Söderlund/Bie (2006)

TTab & vind! (2005) Talang (2007) Talismanen (2003) (mini) Taxibilder (1984) (mini) Tekniskt magasin (1957) Temptation Island (2002/II) Teskedsgumman (1973) Time Out (1982) (mini) Tivoli (2004) Tjejerna gör uppror (1977) (mini) Tjocka släkten (1975) (mini) Toffelhjältarna (1984) Tolvslaget på Skansen (1977) Tomtefamiljen i Storskogen (1962) Tomtemaskinen (1993) Top Model 2006: Milano (2006) Tornado - en tittarstorm (1993) (mini) Torntuppen (1996) (mini) Torpet (1962) (mini) Totte (1973) (mini)Trälen (2006) Trappen (1991) (mini) Trazan & Banarne (1976) Tre från Haparanda, De (1974) (mini) Tre kast (1975) Tre kronor (1994) Tre kärlekar (1989)Tre terminer (1995) (mini) Trekampen (1964) Trollkarlens pojke (1982) (mini) Trolltider (1979) Träpatronerna (1984) (mini) Träpatronerna (1988) (mini)Tunna blå linjen (2021–) Tur i kärlek (1989) Ture Sventon privatdetektiv (1989) Tusenbröder (2002) TV für alle (1995) Två som oss (1999) Tänkande brevbäraren, Den (1963) Täta elden, Den (1995) (mini)

UUlveson och Herngren (2005) Underbar uppfinning, En (1996) (mini) Ungkaren (2003) Upp till kamp (2007) (mini) Uppfinnaren (1991) Uppåt väggarna (1981) Urcellen Ellen (1978) Ursäkta röran, vi bygger om (2002) Utmanarna (1998)

VV som i viking (1991) (mini) Valvet (2000) Varuhuset (1987) Veddemålet (2004) (mini) Vem tar vem? (1991) Vem vill bli miljonär (1999) Vendetta (1995) (mini) Vera med flera (2003) Vi i femman (1970) Vi på Saltkråkan (1964) Villervalle i Söderhavet (1963) Vilse i pannkakan (1975) Vinnarskallar (2006) Vita lögner (1997) Vita stenen, Den (1973) (mini) Vägen till Gyllenblå! (1985) (mini) Vägg i vägg (1986) Vänner och fiender (1996) Världarnas bok (2006) Värmland Classic Festival (1991)

WWallander (2005) Welcome to Sweden (2007) Wild Kids (2005) World of Tosh, The (2002)

XXerxes (1988) (mini)

YYasemin på flykt (1992) (mini)Young Royals (2021)

Z
Zonen (1996) (mini) 
Zvampen (1983) 
Zweite Heimat - Chronik einer Jugend, Die (1992)

External links
 Swedish TV at the Internet Movie Database

Sweden
Series